The Aeroflying Sensation is a French ultralight aircraft, designed by former Airbus engineer Jose Verges and produced by Aeroflying of Saint-André-des-Eaux, Loire-Atlantique. It was introduced at the French Hombuilders Rally in Blois in 2007. The aircraft is supplied as a kit for amateur construction or as a complete ready-to-fly-aircraft.

By 2015 the aircraft was produced by Espace and distribution was handled by Randkar.

Design and development
The Sensation was designed to comply with the Fédération Aéronautique Internationale microlight rules. It features a cantilever low-wing, a two-seats-in-side-by-side configuration enclosed cockpit, a choice of tricycle landing gear or conventional landing gear and a single engine in tractor configuration.

The aircraft is made from riveted aluminum sheet. Its  span wing employs slotted flaps. Standard engines available are the  Rotax 912UL and the  Rotax 912ULS four-stroke powerplants. A variety of kits is available with varying degrees of completion, none of which includes the engine.

Specifications (Sensation)

References

External links 

2000s French ultralight aircraft
Homebuilt aircraft
Single-engined tractor aircraft